The mayor of Iloilo City  is the head of the executive branch of government in Iloilo City, in the Philippines. The mayor holds office at the Iloilo City Hall in Iloilo City Proper. The mayor can serve for three consecutive terms only, although they can be elected again after an interruption of one term.

The current mayor is Jerry Treñas, a member of the National Unity Party (NUP)  Won the Iloilo City Mayoral contest against his brother-in-law, incumbent Mayor Jose S. Espinosa III. Mayor Jerry Treñas won the election with 134,143 total votes which makes him the elected Mayor of the Iloilo City.

List

Municipality of Iloilo

City of Iloilo

References

Mayors of places in Iloilo
Politics of Iloilo City
Local government in Iloilo City
Lists of mayors of places in the Philippines